Shyam Sundar Gupta  (born 31 December 1938) is an Indian politician. He was a Member of Parliament, representing Barh, Bihar in the Lok Sabha the lower house of India's Parliament as a member of the Janata Party.

References

External links
Official biographical sketch in Parliament of India website

India MPs 1977–1979
Lok Sabha members from Bihar
Janata Party politicians
1938 births
Living people
All India Forward Bloc politicians
Mayors of Kolkata